Abacetus cuneipennis is a species of ground beetle in the subfamily Pterostichinae. It was described by Straneo in 1961.

References

cuneipennis
Beetles described in 1961